A Volksfest (German for "people's festival") is a large event in German-speaking countries which usually combines a beer festival or wine festival and a travelling funfair. Attractions may include amusement rides, games of chance and skill, and food and merchandise vendors.

A large beer tent will have hundreds of wooden benches with a seating capacity in the thousands and offer live music, being a favourite place for patrons to spend the evening. The Oktoberfest is the world's biggest Volksfest and occurs yearly in Munich, Bavaria.

Admission
Admission to a Volksfest and the beer tents is free. However, rides or games are paid for separately. In contrast to traveling carnivals in the US, each Volksfest ride is independently run, so tickets for several rides are uncommon. Inside the beer tents, there are usually tables that can be reserved, while the rest are on a first-come, first-served basis.

Duration and location
There is at least one Volksfest in many of the larger towns in Germany every year, each lasting from one to three weeks. In some towns there are two or more per year. A Volkfest is local in nature, attended mostly by people original from the hosting town and surrounding areas, but it may also attract international tourists. Sindelfingen is the only town to have given up its Volksfest.

A Volksfest takes place nearly at the same date every year. A number of these have a long tradition and feature a variety of events like parades in historical costumes or traditional shooting competitions. One of the oldest Volksfests in Germany is the Lullusfest in Bad Hersfeld. A Volksfest usually takes place in a special location. Some of these sites are well known such as the Cannstatter Wasen in Stuttgart and Theresienwiese in Munich; however there are some Volksfest events which take place partly in the streets of towns.

As the Volkfest is temporary in nature, most mechanical attractions, games and beer tents are assembled in the weeks or months prior to the start of the festival, and dismantled once it is over.

Clothing
Especially in Bavaria, it is common during the Volksfest for people to wear the Tracht or traditional outfits such as Lederhosen and white or chequered shirts for men, and the Dirndl for women.

Well-known events

 Augsburger Plärrer in Augsburg
 Bad Kreuznacher Jahrmarkt in Bad Kreuznach
 Barthelmarkt in Oberstimm near Ingolstadt
 Baumblütenfest in Werder
 Bergkirchweih in Erlangen
 Biberacher Schützenfest in Biberach an der Riss 
 Cannstatter Volksfest, Stuttgart – the largest Volksfest in the world
 Gäubodenvolksfest in Straubing
 Gillamoos in Abensberg
 Hamburger Dom in Hamburg
 Kiel Week in Kiel
 Kinderzeche in Dinkelsbühl
 Kramermarkt in Oldenburg
 Maschseefest in Hanover
 Oktoberfest, Munich – The largest beer festival in the world
 Oktoberfest Hannover – The second largest  beer festival in Germany
 Rutenfest in Ravensburg
 Schützenfest in Hanover – the largest rifle club funfair in the world
 Wurstmarkt, Bad Dürkheim

References

Notes

Beer gardens in Germany